Don R. Birrell (1922–2006) was director of the Crocker Art Museum in Sacramento, California, from 1951 to 1953, and was the design director for the Nut Tree in Vacaville, California, from 1953 until his retirement in 1990. In addition to his design work at the Nut Tree, Birrell also created the Vacaville city logo, the logo for the Vacaville Reporter newspaper, and the artwork seen on the side of Raley's Supermarkets trucks. Birrell was also a painter of landscape watercolors. His house on Kendal Street in Vacaville was famously filled with examples of his design work for the Nut Tree.

Early life and education
Don Birrell was born December 6, 1922, in Corona, California. He grew up in Sacramento, California, and attended Sacramento City College.

Director of the Crocker Art Museum
Birrell served as the director of the Crocker Art Museum in Sacramento from 1951 to 1953. In 1951, he organized an exhibition of the work of artist Martín Ramírez at the Crocker Art Museum. In 1952, the drawing "Madonna in Landscape with Cars" by Ramírez was received by Charles Eames and Ray Eames in a letter from Don Birrell.

Design director for the Nut Tree
In 1953, Birrell became design director for the Nut Tree restaurant in Vacaville, where he remained until his retirement in 1990. The Nut Tree had its own design department headed by him. In 1960, Birrell mounted an exhibition of paintings by Wayne Thiebaud that were inspired by Thiebaud's travels to Mexico.

Graphic design style: The Nut Tree look
Birrell's graphic design style can be characterized as minimalist, colorful, and highly abstracted. He is credited with creating the Nut Tree's "look", from graphic design to food presentations to menu design.

Birrell was admired and was influenced by a number of artists and designers, notably: Charles and Ray Eames, Maynard Dixon, Rockwell Kent, Grant Wood, Saul Bass, Herbert Bayer, Alexander Calder, Cassandre, William Moore, Piet Mondrian, Alexander Girard, László Moholy-Nagy, Thomas Moran, George Nelson, Paul Rand, and Charles Sheeler.

The Vacaville Museum exhibited a retrospective of Birrell's work, Don Birrell by Design in 2003.

Later life and death
Birrell died on June 30, 2006. Following his death, the July 5, 2006, meeting of the Solano County Board of Supervisors adjourned in his memory.

Logos designed by Don Birrell

Artwork by Don Birrell

Other designs by Don Birrell

References 

American graphic designers
Modernist designers
People from Vacaville, California